Khaled: A Tale of Arabia is a fantasy novel by F. Marion Crawford. It was first published in hardcover by Macmillan and Co. in 1891; its first paperback edition was issued by Ballantine Books as the thirty-ninth volume of the Ballantine Adult Fantasy series in December, 1971. The Ballantine edition includes an introduction by Lin Carter. 

The novel is an oriental romance written in the style of the Arabian Nights.

Plot summary

Khaled has no soul – but he is offered one chance: if his wife comes to love him, despite his lack of a soul, he will become fully human.

Footnotes

External links

 
 
 Google page scans of the novel

1891 American novels
British fantasy novels
Novels by Francis Marion Crawford
Macmillan Publishers books